Russian candy (kinuski) is a very sweet toffee-like dessert made by carefully heating equal amounts of milk or cream and sugar. It is a traditional dessert sauce in Nordic countries. Karl Fazer brought the first Russian candy recipe to Finland from St. Petersburg.

See also

References

External links 
 Recipe using Russian candy 
 History of Fazer Café

Confectionery
Russian cuisine